Trần Lê Quốc Toàn (born 5 April 1989) is a male Vietnamese weightlifter who competed at the 2012 Summer Olympics in the -56 kg class. He initially finished 4th, however was awarded the bronze medal in 2019, after the originally 3rd Valentin Hristov of Azerbaijan was disqualified for doping.

He placed 4th in both the 2012 and 2013 World Championships behind Valentin Hristov and compatriot Thach Kim Tuan.

Trần Lê Quốc Toàn finished in 5th at the 2016 Olympics, with a total of 275 kg (snatch = 121 kg, clean and jerk = 154 kg).

References

External links
 

Vietnamese male weightlifters
Olympic weightlifters of Vietnam
Olympic bronze medalists for Vietnam
1989 births
Living people
Weightlifters at the 2012 Summer Olympics
Weightlifters at the 2016 Summer Olympics
Weightlifters at the 2010 Asian Games
Weightlifters at the 2014 Asian Games
Weightlifters at the 2018 Asian Games
World Weightlifting Championships medalists
People from Da Nang
Southeast Asian Games gold medalists for Vietnam
Southeast Asian Games medalists in weightlifting
Competitors at the 2011 Southeast Asian Games
Asian Games competitors for Vietnam
Olympic medalists in weightlifting
Medalists at the 2012 Summer Olympics
21st-century Vietnamese people